Il mistero di Bellavista (also known as Bellavista's Mystery and The Mystery of Bellavista) is a 1985 Italian comedy film written, directed and starring Luciano De Crescenzo.

Plot
From the terrace of his building Professor Bellavista is observing Halley's comet. The goalkeeper Salvatore and his friend Saverio, instead of framing the comet, mistakenly point the telescope lens towards the window of an apartment in the opposite building, believing they are witnessing the murder of Mrs. Jolanda, a second-hand clothing dealer. Once on the spot, the mistress of the suspect apartment, a fur trafficker, is actually missing, leaving the ragù on the fire, even if the body is not found.

The group, together with other acquaintances, begins to privately investigate the crime, stumbling upon rather original subjects including a couple of elderly sisters who, to avoid eviction, pretend to have a crazy nephew at home, a decayed noble art expert who with the complicity of his wife he organizes dramas in order to sell fake paintings of value, until he runs into the Italian-American furrier Frank Amodio, a shady trafficker and lover of the missing lady.

Thanks to him, Bellavista's son-in-law who emigrated to the North finds his first buyer for a nuclear shelter, and it turns out that the missing lady had actually left suddenly.

Cast  
 
 Luciano De Crescenzo as Professor Gennaro Bellavista
  Sergio Solli as  Saverio 
  Benedetto Casillo as Salvatore 
 Marina Confalone as  Rachelina 
 Renato Scarpa as Dr. Cazzaniga
 Andy Luotto as  Frank Amodio
 Marisa Laurito as  Marquise Marisa Buonajuto di Pontecagnano
 Riccardo Pazzaglia as  Marquis Filiberto Buonajuto di Pontecagnano
 Nuccia Fumo as Mrs. Carmelina Finizio
  Nunzia Fumo as  Mrs. Camilla Finizio
  Gerardo Scala as  Luigino 
  Renato Rutigliano as  Capuozzo
  Lucio Allocca as Mercalli 
  Geppy Gleijeses as Giorgio 
  Luigi Uzzo as  Armando 
  Max Turilli as  Frank Footter

See also
 List of Italian films of 1985

References

External links

1985 comedy films
1985 films
Films directed by Luciano De Crescenzo
Italian comedy films
1980s Italian-language films
1980s Italian films